

History 
Orlik Airport was made in the time of the Soviet Union. In 1992, the airport was half closed. In 2001, it was closed due to money loss of Bural. In 2013 the airport was re-opened, when PANH opened the new flight to Ulan-Ude.

Airlines and destinations

References

External links

Airports in Buryatia
Airports built in the Soviet Union
Buildings and structures in Ulan-Ude